Poland competed at the 1954 European Athletics Championships in Bern, Switzerland, from 25-29 August 1954. A delegation of 35 athletes were sent to represent the country.

Medals

References

European Athletics Championships
1954
Nations at the 1954 European Athletics Championships